The National Alliance of Professional Social Workers (KÄQŪA) is a professional association in Kazakhstan that was founded on 8 April 2019. The KÄQŪA assists the development social work as a profession, expanding and strengthening international cooperation, providing expert and educational assistance to social workers at all levels.

History 
The National Alliance of Professional Social Workers (KÄQŪA) was formed according to the association's charter protocol meeting on 27 March 2019 and undergoing subsequent registration by the Ministry of Justice on 8 April 2019 in which KÄQŪA designates the date as the official founding date. The association's aim is to unite professional social employees and professionals who perform social work functions within the platforms of social protection, healthcare, education, justice and law enforcement and to mainly form social work as a profession in Kazakhstan.

On 7 October 2022, the KÄQŪA for the first time took part in the 2022 presidential elections, where it nominated public figure Qaraqat Äbden as a candidate for the race.

Election results

Presidential

References 

Social work organizations in Kazakhstan
Organizations established in 2019
2019 establishments in Kazakhstan